Spurgeon Creek is a stream in Thurston County in the U.S. state of Washington. It is a tributary to the Deschutes River.

Spurgeon Creek was named after George Spurgeon, a pioneer who settled at the creek in the 1850s.

References

Rivers of Thurston County, Washington
Rivers of Washington (state)